M. Dagiero Dagiero (born 24 September 1991) is a male Nauruan sprinter. He competed in the Men's  100 metres event at the 2015 World Championships in Athletics in Beijing, China.

See also
 Nauru at the 2015 World Championships in Athletics

References

Nauruan male sprinters
Living people
Place of birth missing (living people)
1991 births
World Athletics Championships athletes for Nauru